Karl-Heinz Vosgerau (Kiel, 16 August 1927 – 4 January 2021) was a German actor, mostly in television.

Selected filmography
  (1970, TV miniseries)
 Eight Hours Don't Make a Day (1972, TV series)
 World on a Wire (1973, TV film)
 The Lost Honour of Katharina Blum (1975)
  (1977, TV film)
 Derrick - Season 7, Episode 6: "Die Entscheidung" (1980, TV)
 The Man in Pyjamas (1981)
 The Roaring Fifties (1983)
 Patrik Pacard (1984, TV miniseries)
 Die Wächter (1986, TV miniseries)
 M.E.T.R.O. – Ein Team auf Leben und Tod (2006, TV series)

References

External links
 
 Erna Baumbauer Management Munich 

1927 births
2021 deaths
German male television actors
20th-century German male actors
21st-century German male actors
Actors from Kiel